Everett Owens is the pen name under which Rob Thomas authored three books in The X-Files young adult series. Thomas constructed the pen name from the names of his two dogs.

The X-Files young adult series 
Control, 
Howlers, 
Regeneration,

References 

American children's writers
Year of birth missing (living people)
Living people